Edvin Frigast Larsen (20 December 1899 – 25 November 1962) was a Danish footballer who played as a goalkeeper. He made 22 appearances for the Denmark national team from 1921 to 1929.

References

External links
 
 

1899 births
1962 deaths
Danish men's footballers
Footballers from Copenhagen
Association football goalkeepers
Denmark international footballers
Akademisk Boldklub players